Lê Thị or Linh Chiếu Thái hậu (1108–1161) was a Vietnamese empress regent.

She was married to emperor Lý Thần Tông.

She served as Regent of Vietnam during the minority of her son emperor Lý Anh Tông between 1138 and 1158.

References

12th-century women rulers
12th-century Vietnamese women
Lý dynasty empresses dowager